Greta theudelinda is a species of butterfly of the family Nymphalidae. It is found in Colombia, Ecuador, Bolivia and Peru.

Subspecies
Greta theudelinda theudelinda (Colombia)
Greta theudelinda zalmunna (Hewitson, 1869) (Ecuador)
Greta theudelinda cyrcilla (Hewitson, 1874) (Bolivia)
Greta theudelinda bonita (Vitale & Bollino, 2001) (Ecuador)

There are also three undescribed subspecies from Peru.

References

Ithomiini
Nymphalidae of South America
Butterflies described in 1861
Taxa named by William Chapman Hewitson